Barkatpura is a neighbourhood in Hyderabad, Telangana, India. The Barkatpura Chaman is a popular landmark of this suburb. 

There are many diagnostic centres, hospitals and parks located here. It is a primarily residential area, and is located close to the Kacheguda Railway Station.

The Provident Fund Office is located here.

Barkatpura is named after Sheikh Barkat Ali, Professor of Mathematics and Head of Department, Osmania university, Hyderabad.

Educational centres and hospitals
Colleges:
Raja Bahadur Venkata Rama Reddy Women’s College (Reddy Women's College)
Nrupatunga Junior, Degree and PG college
 St. Francis Xavier Degree College
 St. Francis Xavier Junior College
 Global Institute of Hotel Management
 Nalsar University of Law Corporate Office
 Andhra Yuvathi Mandali College and school
 Andhra Mahila College
 Bharath PG College
 Avanthi College

Hospitals
 Woodlands Hospitals
 MEDALL Diagnostics
 Sri Krishna Super Speciality Neuro Hospital
 CC Shroff Memorial Hospital
 Geetha Clinic and Maternity Home
 Shalini Hospital
 Ankilla Dental and Polyclinic
 Bristlecone Hospital
 Hepa Scan Center

Barkatpura also has the office of the Dyslexia Association of Andhra Pradesh.

Transport
Barkatpura is well-connected by the state-run bus service TSRTC, which has a depot in Barkatpura.

The closest MMTS Train station is at Kachiguda.

References

Barkatpura is named after Sheikh Barkat Ali, Professor of Mathematics and Head of Department, Osmania university, Hyderabad.

Neighbourhoods in Hyderabad, India